Neuza Silva (born 4 May 1983) is a retired Portuguese tennis player. Her career-high singles ranking is world No. 133, reached on 6 July 2009;, on 6 July 2008, she peaked at No. 185 in the doubles rankings. Silva regularly competed for the Portugal Fed Cup team with a total win–loss record of 16–6.

Career
Silva debuted in the ITF Women's Circuit in Vila do Conde with a first-round loss. Her first high-level match came in 2002 at the Estoril Open, followed soon by her first presence in the Fed Cup. Both matches resulted in defeat.

Her greatest moment came at home at the 2004 Estoril Open when she defeated Julia Schruff, the previous year finalist, 3–6, 7–6, 7–6, to become the first Portuguese female player to win a singles match at the tournament. She then lost to fourth seed Denisa Chládková, in straight sets.

The year 2009 proved to be a breakthrough year for Silva. In February, she entered her first tour event outside of Portugal in Pattaya and reached the second round, defeating Jessica Moore 6–2, 6–1 before losing in two sets to home player and sixth seed, Tamarine Tanasugarn.

In May, at Estoril, she played first seed Iveta Benešová in the first round, losing in three sets. In doubles, with Alexandra Dulgheru, she reached the quarterfinals.

On 18 June 2009, Silva qualified for her first Grand Slam tournament at Wimbledon, where she lost to second seed Serena Williams, 1–6, 5–7 in the first round.

Her next WTA Tour event was the Tashkent Open in September, where she lost in the first round to eighth seed Galina Voskoboeva.

2010 was an injured filled year for Silva, who missed most of the season. Her last match came in June during the Wimbledon Championships qualifying tournament where she lost in the first round to Michaëlla Krajicek, in straight sets.

Citing constant pain in both of her knees, Silva retired on 12 September 2010.

ITF Circuit finals

Singles: 20 (12 titles, 8 runner-ups)

Doubles: 28 (18 titles, 10 runner-ups)

Singles performance timeline

 ''Fed Cup matches are included in the statistics. Walkovers are neither official wins nor official losses.

Fed Cup
Silva played for the Portugal Fed Cup team from 2002 to 2009. Her singles record is 9–6 and her doubles record is 9–3 (18–9 overall).

Participations (27)

Singles (15)

Doubles (12)

See also
 Luso Ténis Profile (in Portuguese)

External links
 
 
 

1983 births
Living people
Portuguese female tennis players
Sportspeople from Setúbal
20th-century Portuguese women
21st-century Portuguese women